Albert Squires (born 17 August 1958) is a Canadian weightlifter. He competed in the men's heavyweight II event at the 1984 Summer Olympics.

References

External links
 

1958 births
Living people
Canadian male weightlifters
Olympic weightlifters of Canada
Weightlifters at the 1984 Summer Olympics
Sportspeople from St. John's, Newfoundland and Labrador
20th-century Canadian people
21st-century Canadian people